I'm Dead But I Have Friends is a 2015 French-Belgian comedy film written and directed by brothers Guillaume and Stéphane Malandrin. It was filmed in Brussels, Liège, and Schefferville, in Quebec. The film was nominated for seven Magritte Awards, including Best Film. The film was nominated for the César Award for Best Foreign Film at the 41st César Awards.

Cast
 Bouli Lanners as Yvan
 Wim Willaert as Wim
 Serge Riaboukine as Pierre
 Eddy Leduc as Nico
 Lyes Salem as Dany
 Jacky Lambert as Jipé
 Rosario Amedeo as Van Beek

References

External links

2015 films
2010s comedy road movies
Belgian comedy road movies
French comedy road movies
2015 comedy films
2010s French-language films
French-language Belgian films
2010s French films